Sasural is a 1961 Indian Hindi-language film produced by L. V. Prasad and directed by T. Prakash Rao. The film stars Rajendra Kumar, B. Saroja Devi, Mehmood and Lalita Pawar. The music is by Shankar–Jaikishan and songs were penned by Hasrat Jaipuri, Shailendra. It is a remake of the Telugu film Illarikam (1959). The film became a box office success.

Plot 
Shekhar lives a poor lifestyle along with his maternal uncle Dharamdas, his aunt, cousin Sita – who is separated from her husband, Mahesh; and also has a sister Gauri, who had eloped with her lover and who everyone believes is dead. He studies in college along with wealthy fellow collegian, Bela. The two do not get along, but that changes when Bela's father, Thakur, discovers Shekhar's good character and thinks that he will be a suitable son-in-law. He approaches Dharamdas and arranges their marriage on the condition that Shekhar will become ghar jamai, to which Dharamdas and Shekhar agree. Bela's mom is however displeased, as she would like her daughter to marry Rajan Murari, the son of their employee, Govindram. Despite this, the marriage does take place and Shekhar moves in with his in-laws, is employed by Thakur, and the family settles down to a fairly harmonious relationship. Their idyllic lifestyle is shattered when Bela suspects, and then discovers evidence, that Sita and Mahesh, who are now reunited, have stolen her diamond necklace; that Shekhar is having an affair with a dancing girl; that he has embezzled Rs.10,000/- and had gone to an undisclosed location for three days. Things deteriorate when Thakur meets with an accident, and subsequently passes away – paving the way for his wife to arrange her daughter's divorce and Shekhar's death.

Cast 
 Rajendra Kumar as Shekhar
 Saroja Devi as Bela
 Mehmood as Mahesh
 Lalita Pawar as Bela's mother
 Shubha Khote as Sita
 Jayshree Gadkar as Gauri
 Leela Mishra as Dharamdas' wife (as Leela Misra)
 Bipin Gupta as Thakur
 Wasti as Govindram Murari
 Anwar Hussain as Rajan 'Rajey' Murari
 Dhumal as Dharamdas
 Ratnamala as Thakur's sister
 Randhir as Thakur's Munim
 Moolchand as Thanedar

Soundtrack

Awards 
Filmfare Best Male Playback Award for Mohammed Rafi singing "Chashme Buddoor"

References

External links 
 

1961 films
1960s Hindi-language films
Films scored by Shankar–Jaikishan
Hindi remakes of Telugu films
Films directed by T. Prakash Rao